Maywood is a Metra commuter railroad station in the village of Maywood, Illinois, a western suburb of Chicago, on the Union Pacific West Line. Trains go east to Ogilvie Transportation Center in Chicago and as far west as Elburn, Illinois. Travel time to Ogilvie is 22 to 27 minutes. , Maywood is the 194th busiest of the 236 non-downtown stations in the Metra system, with an average of 87 weekday boardings. Unless otherwise announced, inbound trains use the north platform and outbound trains use the south platform. The middle track does not have platform access.

As of December 5, 2022, Maywood is served by 38 trains (19 in each direction) on weekdays, by 11 trains (five inbound, six outbound) on Saturdays, and by 10 trains (four inbound, six outbound) on Sundays and holidays.

The station's parking is along Main Street between 1st Avenue to the east and 4th Avenue to the west. The station is in the heart of Maywood's business district. Across the tracks to the south of the station is the Maywood Public Library, the Maywood Police Station, and Veteran's Memorial Park, the Village's largest park. Pace suburban buses stop on North 5th Avenue and one block to the north on Lake Street.

A newly constructed commuter station opened on June 30, 2017.

Bus connections
Pace
 309 Lake Street 
 313 St. Charles Road 
 331 Cumberland/5th Avenue

References

External links
Metra - Maywood
Station from 5th Avenue from Google Maps Street View

Metra stations in Illinois
Former Chicago and North Western Railway stations
Maywood, Illinois
Railway stations in Cook County, Illinois
Union Pacific West Line